Dudley Tricker (26 May 1944 – 10 May 1998) was a South African cricketer. He played in nineteen first-class and two List A matches for Border from 1963/64 to 1970/71.

See also
 List of Border representative cricketers

References

External links
 

1944 births
1998 deaths
South African cricketers
Border cricketers
Cricketers from Port Elizabeth